Penguin Bank is the name given to a now-submerged shield volcano of the Hawaiian Islands.  Its coral-capped remains lie immediately west of the island of Molokai, under relatively shallow water (see bathymetric map at the right).

Geology
The Penguin Bank volcano is part of the Hawaiian-Emperor seamount chain. It was one of the seven principal Cenozoic Era volcanoes that formerly constituted the prehistoric island of Maui Nui, along with West Molokai, East Molokai, Lānai, West Maui, East Maui, and Kahoolawe. The date of the last eruption is unknown. 

It appears a landslide occurred around the southeastern part of the volcano, near the Lanai area. A possible time frame for this supposed collapse would be roughly between 300,000 to around 700,000 years ago. There is no determined evidence for a collapse as it's unclear if the supposed landslide debris field near the large gap seen from satellite view is actually from Penguin Bank or not. The cause is likely from erosion when the volcano was still above the surface.

Boundary area
The site coordinates are: NW; NE; SW; and SE.

Conservation
Plans to build wind turbines on Penguin Bank were called off in April 2009, because the site is located in the heart of the Hawaiian Islands Humpback Whale National Marine Sanctuary, requiring a lease from the then-active Minerals Management Service (MMS).  However, the MMS would not issue leases within marine sanctuaries, effectively killing the project.

References

Volcanoes of Maui Nui
Undersea banks of the Pacific Ocean
Geography of Maui County, Hawaii
Hawaiian–Emperor seamount chain
Pleistocene shield volcanoes
Pleistocene Oceania
Cenozoic Hawaii
Maui County, Hawaii
Shield volcanoes of the United States
Polygenetic shield volcanoes